Horace O. Crane (1808June 4, 1872) was an American medical doctor and Republican politician.  He served one year in the Wisconsin State Senate (1861), representing Winnebago County, and was field surgeon and later a medical examiner for the Union Army in the American Civil War.

Biography
Crane earned his medical doctorate from Western Reserve College in 1848 and shortly thereafter moved to the new state of Wisconsin, establishing a practice at Green Bay.  At some point prior to 1856, he relocated to Winnebago County, where he was a village trustee at Winnebago Rapids (now Neenah, Wisconsin).  He was subsequently elected as Winnebago County's representative in the Wisconsin State Senate in the 1860 election.  He served through the 1861 session of the Legislature, but then resigned to volunteer his services as a surgeon for the Union Army.

In June 1861, he was enrolled as first assistant surgeon in the 3rd Wisconsin Infantry Regiment.  He proceeded with the regiment to Hagerstown, Maryland, in July. Shortly after the regiment's arrival, Dr. Crane was assigned to work as surgeon-in-charge at the field hospital established at St. John's College in Annapolis, Maryland.  He served two years here, assisted by his daughter, who volunteered as a nurse.  In May 1863, he resigned from his field duties and was appointed examining surgeon for the Union Army enrollment board in Wisconsin's Green Bay district.  In this role, his duty was to perform medical examinations of volunteers and conscripts to determine if they were fit to serve.

After the war, Dr. Crane continued to practice medicine at Green Bay.  He died at his home on June 2, 1872.

References

External links
 

Date of birth unknown
1808 births
1872 deaths
Politicians from Green Bay, Wisconsin
Politicians from Neenah, Wisconsin
Republican Party Wisconsin state senators
19th-century American politicians
Union Army surgeons